High Point (frequently called Ashokan High Point) is a mountain located in the Catskill Mountains of New York west of Olivebridge. Mombaccus Mountain is located southwest, and South Mountain is located north of High Point.

References

Mountains of Ulster County, New York
Mountains of New York (state)